The 2nd constituency of Mayotte is a French legislative constituency on the island of Mayotte.

Deputies

Election results

2022

 
 
 
|-
| colspan="8" bgcolor="#E9E9E9"|
|-

2017

2012

Sources and references
 French Interior Ministry results website: 

French legislative constituencies